My Two Dads is an American sitcom that was produced by Michael Jacobs Productions in association with Tri-Star Television and distributed by TeleVentures. It starred Paul Reiser, Greg Evigan and Staci Keanan. The series premiered on NBC on September 20, 1987, and aired 60 episodes over three seasons, concluding on April 30, 1990.

Series overview

Episodes

Season 1 (1987–88)

Season 2 (1989)

Season 3 (1989–90)

References

External links 
 
 

Lists of American sitcom episodes